Esthappan is a 1980 Malayalam film written and directed by G. Aravindan. Aravindan also co-composed the music and edited the film. Rajan Kakkanadan, Krishnapuram Leela, Sudharma and Shobhana form the cast. The film blends together the Biblical story of the deeds of Christ and the way society responded to him, with the life of Esthappan, whose life mystified others. It won the Kerala State Film Awards for Best Film and Best Director.

Plot
Esthappan, a fisherman lives in a seashore colony of fishermen. To the fisherfolk of the coastal Christian village, he is at once an eccentric simpleton, a possessed soothsayer and faith healer, and a Satanic grave stealer. Esthappan's story unfolds through narrations of other fishermen about the miracles created by him. Through the contradictory statements of these people, a mystical figure of Esthappan unfolds.

The first sequence of Esthappan is a long shot of Esthappan walking by the seashore, which creates an illusory feeling that he is walking over the waves and crossing the sea. Esthappan's miraculous acts like printing his own money and drinking whisky without getting drunk are narrated by people.
He is described as a prophet, miraculous healer, thief and charlatan by different people. Finally when the disappearance of Esthappan from the colony creates concern among fellow fishermen, the priest of the church consoles them that Esthappan would definitely come back.

Critical Commentary
The character of Esthappan is always engaged in all sorts of things (in a moral way) to make people remind of Christ. At the sea shore and on the walls he draws pictures of Christ. It is evident after the homily given by the priest that the film gives importance to act besides belief. This very thing acts as the manifesto of the film Esthappan. The fishermen community of the place works (different sorts of ‘acts’) so hard and so do all other men and women of the locality. Yet the greatness of their acts is lost once the same community indulges without any moral concerns, in immoral and illegal acts. They lose the greatness of their effort (acts) through excessive drinking, gossiping, being promiscuous and through exploiting each other in many ways. This reprobate state of the people is what drives Esthappan to do what he does. He, who was once a fisherman now does no work other than doing things that will remind the people of Christ. He thinks that to work without a philosophy, is a waste. Therefore, his attempt is at the heart of the people who have forgotten Christ. In order to do that he comes to help people from diseases, from false acquisitions, from debt, from dangers etc. like Christ did. But his constant worries and thoughts while doing all these suggest us that he is not satisfied from these external acts alone. He is worried more about getting into the hearts of people where lay the real problem; the question of morality and conscience. Esthappan is not against established dogmas of the Church or against the practices of her. His attendance of mass celebrated in the church and his asking for the incenses are examples for this.
The audience come to know about Esthappan solely through the narration of different characters. Though for most part Esthappan is doing benevolent deeds he is seen by some as a trickster. Sometimes people talk about him in hostile tones. However those who directly received the goodness of his deeds, like the children and women, talk nicely about him. The reason why others talk ill of Esthappan is that either he does things that they are not capable of (for which they are jealous) or because they basically are immoral to accept someone’s good deeds. He can be seen doing a deathlike act which he himself clears as a sleep-act (Like Christ’s death on the cross) that might be to suggest that Christ was made to sleep by the same people for which He came and that He is not dead but still lives even on the cross. The inability of Esthappan in completely representing Christ stems from the vastness of Christ’s infinite nature. This is reflected in the disillusions and restlessness of the finite character Esthappan. The final image of Esthappan accompanied with the death toll seems like to suggest that he finally lost in his attempt to redraw the attention of the people toward Christ.

Cast
Rajan Kakkanadan
Krishnapuram Leela
Sudharma
Shobhana

References

External links
 

1980s Malayalam-language films
Films directed by G. Aravindan
Films about faith healing